The Twelfth Council of Ministers of Bosnia and Herzegovina (Bosnian and Croatian: Dvanaesti saziv Vijeća ministara Bosne i Hercegovine) was the Council of Ministers of Bosnia and Herzegovina cabinet formed on 31 March 2015, following the 2014 general election. It was led by Chairman of the Council of Ministers Denis Zvizdić. The cabinet was dissolved on 23 December 2019 and was succeeded by a new Council of Ministers presided over by Zoran Tegeltija.

Investiture

Party breakdown
Party breakdown of cabinet ministers:

Cabinet members
The Cabinet was structured into the offices for the chairman of the Council of Ministers, the two vice chairs and 9 ministries.

References

External links
Website of the Council of Ministers

2015 establishments in Bosnia and Herzegovina
Cabinets established in 2015
2019 disestablishments in Bosnia and Herzegovina
Cabinets disestablished in 2019